Sir Herbert John Baptista Manzoni CBE MICE (21 March 1899 – 18 November 1972) was a British civil engineer known for holding the position of City Engineer and Surveyor of Birmingham from 1935 until 1963. This position put him in charge of all municipal works and his influence on the city, especially following World War II, completely changed the image of Birmingham.

Life
Manzoni was born in Birkenhead, the son of a Milanese sculptor, and was educated both in Birkenhead and Liverpool. He moved to Birmingham in 1923 and became an engineering assistant in the Sewers and Rivers Department. He became Chief Engineer for the department four years later. Unlike many other cities, planning and architectural issues came largely under the control of the city's Chief Engineer.

In 1935, Herbert Humphries retired from his post as City Surveyor and Manzoni took over the post at the age of 36. In 1941, Manzoni anticipated the damage that would be caused by the Birmingham Blitz and, in October 1941, announced the creation of four advisory panels within the council to focus upon Housing, Traffic, Redevelopment Areas and Limitation of the city. A 1938 report identified that there was a serious housing shortage that still needed to be addressed in Birmingham. Manzoni launched a citywide slum clearance scheme, and replaced the housing with high density schemes consisting of tower blocks. He used the Town and Country Planning Act 1944 (to which he contributed) to designate redevelopment areas in Birmingham. Manzoni took advantage of the Housing Act of 1936 to designate  of land in Duddeston and Nechells as a redevelopment area. This was approved in 1950. The first tower blocks to be built in the area were completed in 1954 and the entire scheme was completed in 1972. Together, they contained nearly 250,000 houses that were considered unfit for habitation and they were one half of the entire slum property in the city. The houses were purchased by the council using Compulsory Purchase Orders.

Manzoni encouraged zoning of areas and redevelopment. He did not believe in the preservation of old buildings and saw their retention for sentimental purposes rather than valuable purposes. This was shown in his work which resulted in the loss of many old buildings and historic areas of the city. His attitudes became the orthodoxy and directly or indirectly led to the demolition of a number of much loved landmarks, such as the old Birmingham Central Library and the original Bull Ring market hall.

Manzoni's most famous utterance on the city's architecture neatly encapsulates his attitudes:

An urban motorway system was also launched by Manzoni. This had been advocated by William Haywood in his 1918 book, The Development of Birmingham. Manzoni began planning an Inner Ring Road from 1943, and an Act of Parliament was passed in 1946 allowing construction to commence. The first section, Smallbrook Queensway, was not started until 1957 and was completed in 1960. The entire ring road was opened by Queen Elizabeth II in 1971. Demolition of Masshouse Circus on the ring road began in March 2002 and further sections were demolished or demoted following it. The construction of the Inner Ring Road had resulted in the demolition of the Market Hall at the Bull Ring, the Central Library, Mason Science College and the Central Technical College. A Middle Ring Road was constructed following this, cutting through the Jewellery Quarter, and an Outer Ring Road was also designated. Following the demolition of parts of the Inner Ring Road, Birmingham City Centre is now considered to be the area within the Middle Ring Road. According to urban designer Nick Corbett, planners started realising from the 1980s that the Queensway "was stifling growth as well as having a rather brutal appearance."

In February 1960, Manzoni was elected president of the Institution of Civil Engineers, a position he served in for 21 months instead of the customary year-long tenure due to the untimely death of his predecessor Arthur Hartley.

References

        
        
        
        
        
        
        
        
        
        

Architects from Birmingham, West Midlands
1899 births
1972 deaths
Commanders of the Order of the British Empire
English civil engineers
Knights Bachelor
Presidents of the Institution of Civil Engineers
People from Birkenhead
Chancellors of Loughborough University